The 1926 National Championship (Serbo-Croato-Slovenian: Državno prvenstvo 1926 / Државно првенство 1926)  was a football competition held within the Kingdom of Serbs, Croats, and Slovenes. The two dominant teams of pre-World War II Yugoslav football, Jugoslavija and Građanski, began laying the foundations of the next seven decades of a deeply rooted rivalry between Zagreb and Belgrade. Both teams dominated the competition with comfortable margins, but were quite evenly matched in the finals.

Tournament

Quarter finals

|}

Semi finals

|}

Final

|}

Winning squad
Champions:

GRAĐANSKI ZAGREB (coach: Imre Poszony)
Maksimilijan Mihalčić
Franz Mantler
Miho Remec
Miroslav Arnold
Rudolf Rupec
Dragutin Vragović
Géza Ábrahám
Rudolf Hitrec
Emil Perška
Franjo Giler
Luka Vidnjević

Top scorers
Final goalscoring position, number of goals, player/players and club.
1 - 8 goals - Dušan Petković (Jugoslavija)
2 - 6 goals - Franjo Giler (Građanski Zagreb)
3 - 5 goals - Dragan Jovanović (Jugoslavija)

See also
Yugoslav Cup
Yugoslav League Championship
Football Association of Yugoslavia

References

External links
Yugoslavia Domestic Football Full Tables

1
Yugoslav Football Championship